VfL Lohbrügge is a German association football club based in Hamburg. As of the 2021–22 season, the club plays in the Oberliga Hamburg.

References

External links
Official website
Fussball.de profile

Football clubs in Hamburg
Multi-sport clubs in Germany
Association football clubs established in 1892
1892 establishments in Germany